The 1972 Holy Cross Crusaders football team was an American football team that represented the College of the Holy Cross during the 1972 NCAA University Division football season. Ed Doherty returned for his second year as head coach. The team compiled a record of 5–4–1.

Holy Cross competed as an independent despite having joined the Yankee Conference in 1971. Because their previous scheduling commitments for the 1972 season would not have allowed them to play the full Yankee round-robin, the Crusaders were excluded from the Yankee Conference football championship. Nonetheless, Holy Cross coaches participated in the conference's preseason media night, expressing their enthusiasm about full participation in league play in the coming years. 

Three months later, college officials had a different view of the future. Having made the decision to admit women to what had formerly been an all-male college, administrators worried that soon there would not be enough men on campus to stay competitive in the full range of Yankee Conference sports. On November 14, with the football season still in progress, they made the announcement that Holy Cross would withdraw from the Yankee Conference, effective immediately. 

As in 1971, Holy Cross played two longstanding Yankee Conference opponents in 1972, beating Massachusetts days before the withdrawal announcement, and Connecticut a couple weeks after. Neither game was considered a conference matchup.

All home games were played at Fitton Field on the Holy Cross campus in Worcester, Massachusetts.

Schedule

Statistical leaders
Statistical leaders for the 1972 Crusaders included: 
 Rushing: Joe Wilson, 885 yards and 7 touchdowns on 183 attempts
 Passing: Peter Vaas, 637 yards, 47 completions and 5 touchdowns on 111 attempts
 Receiving: Joe Neary, 251 yards and 1 touchdown on 20 receptions
 Scoring: Joe Wilson, 48 points from 8 touchdowns
 Total offense: Joe Wilson, 885 yards (all rushing)
 All-purpose yards: Joe Wilson, 975 yards (885 rushing, 90 receiving)
 Interceptions: John Provost, 9 interceptions for 175 yards

References

Holy Cross
Holy Cross Crusaders football seasons
Holy Cross Crusaders football